Eratyra is a village and a community of the Voio municipality. Before the 2011 local government reform it was part of the municipality of Askio, of which it was a municipal district. The 2011 census recorded 1,097 inhabitants in the village. The community of Eratyra covers an area of 56.381 km2.

See also
 List of settlements in the Kozani regional unit

References

Populated places in Kozani (regional unit)